Sebastián Ignacio Silva Pérez (born 16 July 1991) is a Chilean footballer currently playing for C.D. Cobresal of the Chilean Primera División.

References
BDFA Profile 

1991 births
Living people
Chilean footballers
Audax Italiano footballers
Deportes Iberia footballers
San Luis de Quillota footballers
Coquimbo Unido footballers
Cobresal footballers
Chilean Primera División players
Primera B de Chile players
Association football defenders